Lior Zada (born 26 December 1978), is an Israeli football coach who using as an assistant manager at Hapoel Jerusalem and the youth team's head coach.

Career 
On 13 June 2022 he was appointed Hapoel Jerusalem's assistant manager and also the manager of the youth team.

References

External links

1993 births
Living people
Israeli footballers
Hapoel Mevaseret Zion F.C. players
Footballers from Jerusalem
Association football midfielders
Israeli football managers
Hapoel Katamon Jerusalem F.C. managers
Maccabi Jaffa managers
Maccabi Kiryat Gat F.C. managers
Hapoel Nir Ramat HaSharon F.C. managers
Hapoel Ramat Gan F.C. managers
Maccabi Ahi Nazareth F.C. managers
Sektzia Ness Ziona F.C. managers